In the 1999-2000 season, the Golden Gophers ice hockey team from the University of Minnesota won its first women’s national team title at the AWCHA National Championship. Nadine Muzerall scored the game-winning goal in the 4-2 national championship win over Brown Bears and earned all-tournament honors with three goals and an assist in two games. For the season, Muzerall owned totals of 49 goals, 28 assists and 77 points.

Muzerall’s 49 goals, 16 power-play goals and 1.29 goals-per-game were school records. In a 10-0 win over Bemidji State, she set school records with five goals and seven points, during a season which saw her go on a 20-game point streak.

Awards and honors
Nadine Muzerall led the nation in goals (49)
Nadine Muzerall led the nation in power-play goals (16)
Nadine Muzerall led the nation in power-play points (27)
Nadine Muzerall led the nation in game-winning goals (9)
Nadine Muzerall, First Team All-WCHA
Nadine Muzerall, Minnesota team most valuable player honors

References

External links
Official site

Minnesota Golden Gophers women's ice hockey seasons
Minnesota
Minn
Minne
Minne